The Andaman and Nicobar Police is the law enforcement agency for the union territory of Andaman and Nicobar Islands in India.

History of Andaman and Nicobar Police
History of Andaman and Nicobar Police dates back to raising of ‘Sebundy Corps’ in 1858 for protection of Penal Settlements in the Andamans. It was reconstituted in 1867 with strength of 2 Inspectors, 3 Head Constables, 12 Sergeants and 285 Constables. The system of policing was exclusively on the pattern of military organization, with a  small  strength of 75 Civil Policemen for observance   of local   laws and for accompanying the prisoners to the jungle as guards against aboriginal tribes.

An organized form of Policing in Andaman and Nicobar Islands was established in August, 1875 with the extension of Indian Police Act of 1861 to Andaman and Nicobar Islands and Captain Wimberly was appointed as first District Superintendent of Police. In the same year the Chief Commissioner of Andaman and Nicobar was vested with the powers and functions of the Inspector General of Police.

In 1915 Mr. H. G. L. Biggie was the first officer of the Indian Police to be appointed as Commandant and Superintendent of Police. Also in 1915, Charles Carter Chitham was posted to Port Blair as Assistant Superintendent. The Civil Police was separated from Military Police in 1924, after nine years of efforts to form the nucleus of a Civil Police force.

The Japanese occupation of these Islands from 1942 to 1945 ruined the Police and Administrative set up in A&N Islands. As a result, fresh batch of officers and men known as deputation force’'' were drawn after British re-occupation in 1945 from Special Armed Police of Uttar Pradesh and Punjab.Shri. N.F. Santook, the First Indian Police Service officer took charge of the Andaman and Nicobar Police on 16 January 1953, after six years of Independence. However, the Chief Commissioner continued to be ex-officio Inspector General of Police. The Executive Police was further divided into 3 Sub-Divisions, viz. South Andaman, North Andaman  and  Nicobar Group of Islands. Besides, Armed Police, Special  Armed  Police, Criminal Investigation Department, Island Communication, Fire Service, PTS, PMT, PMF and IRBn was also set up as separate units.

The post of Chief of Police was upgraded as Director General of Police in the year 2007 and at present, Andaman  and  Nicobar  Police has  a  strength of 4352 including India Reserve Battalion under the command of the  Director General of Police assisted by 1 IGP, 2 DIGP, 1 Commandant IRBn,  3 District SPs,  1 ASP, 8 DySPs, 7 Asstt. Commandant, 1 Chief Fire Officer and 1 Police Radio Officer.

Mission statement
The Mission of Andaman and Nicobar Police is to provide quality service in line with the objectives of the Police Force, spelt out in the Police Act and the Andaman and Nicobar Police Manual.

The Priority areas are
 Enhancing investigating and crime solving abilities by use of modern methods in day to day police work.
 Pro-active community policing for developing a problem solving approach.
 Strengthening the operational capabilities of the police force through technology intervention.
 Increased use of Information Technology in police work for effective public interface and transparency in police work.

Police Training School
With the passage of time and need, a Police Training School came to be established by drawing competent trainers (in the field of Outdoor and Indoor) out of existing force and it started functioning at Police Line, Port Blair with whatever infrastructure was available. Constable recruits of A&N Police are ever since being imparted basic training at the Police Training School Port Blair. So far 61 batches consisting of more than 3000 recruits have already passed out.

The information about the batchwise strength of constables trainees from 51st batch onwards is as under:

note: * Appointed on compassionate ground due to earthquake/tsunami affect.

References

External links
 Official website

State law enforcement agencies of India
Government of the Andaman and Nicobar Islands
1875 establishments in India
Government agencies established in 1875